Sir John Robert Hugh McKenzie  (5 August 1876 – 26 August 1955) was a New Zealand businessman and philanthropist. He was born in Yarrawalla, Victoria, Australia, on 5 August 1876. In the 1950 New Year Honours, he was appointed a Knight Commander of the Order of the British Empire for public and philanthropic services. In 1996, McKenzie was posthumously inducted into the New Zealand Business Hall of Fame.

References

1876 births
1955 deaths
New Zealand businesspeople
Place of death missing
People from Victoria (Australia)
Australian emigrants to New Zealand
New Zealand Knights Commander of the Order of the British Empire
New Zealand philanthropists